The  (abbreviated OKL) was the high command of the air force of Nazi Germany.

History
The  was organized in a large and diverse structure led by Reich minister and supreme commander of the Air force Hermann Göring. Through the Ministry of Aviation Göring controlled all aspects of aviation in Germany, civilian and military alike. This organization was established in the peacetime period predating the German involvement in the Spanish Civil War.

In early 1937, Göring announced the reorganization of the Reich Air Ministry into military and civilian branches. The military branch was to be led by the Air Force High Command with its chief and general staff. However, the separation of military from civil aviation was incomplete and fragmented. Some parts of the military branch were left under the control of the General Inspector of the Air force, Field marshal general Erhard Milch.

These were:
 Central Branch
 General Air Office
 All the inspectorates

The reasons for this formation was primarily to undermine Milch, who was getting favorable attention from the Party. However, later during the year and early 1938, Göring again changed the organization structure by removing three offices from Milch's and General Staff's control, bringing them under his own direct control.

These were:
 Personnel Office – under Major General Robert Ritter von Greim
 Air Defense – under general of anti-aircraft artillery Günther Rüdel
 Technical Office – under Major General Ernst Udet

After the change these offices became additional power centers in RLM, further fragmenting the top Air force organization. It also crippled important functional areas.

Organization
To gear-up for the European war as the air arm of the combined armed forces of Nazi Germany, the German Air force needed a high command equivalent to that of the Army and the Navy. Thus on 5 February 1935, the OKL was created, and in 1939 the structure of the German Air force was newly organized. The credit for the formation of a true high command goes to Air force general Günther Korten commander of Air Fleet 1 and his Chief of Operations, Karl Koller. They both campaigned to carve a command out of Goring's all-encompassing Ministry of Aviation. The intent was to put the German Air force on a true wartime footing, by grouping all the essential military parts of the RLM into a single command.

It included following branches:
 General Staff
 Operational Staff
 All the Weapon's Inspectorate
 Quartermasters Branch
 Signals Service

Other areas such as training, administration, civil defense and technical design remained under RLM's control. The new organization proved to be more efficient and lasted until the end of the war.

OKL, like its army and navy counterparts, reported to the High Command of the Armed Forces (OKW), which in turn was answerable to Hitler for the operation command of the three branches of the armed forces.

OKL was divided into Forward echelon and Rear echelon. The Forward echelon moved with the theater of operations while Rear echelon remained almost exclusively in Berlin.

OKL was also the operational branch of the German Air force. It was divided operationally into Air fleets at a high level. Initially it was divided into four Air fleets that were formed geographically and were numbered consecutively. Three more Air fleets were added later on as Germany controlled territory grew further. Each Air fleet was a self-contained entity. The leader of each was in charge of overall air operations and support activities. However a Fighter leader was in charge of all the fighter operations and reported to the chief of the Air fleet.

Each Air fleet was further divided into Air districts and Flying Corps. Each Air district had 50 to 150 officers led by a major general. It was responsible for providing administrative and logistical structure as well as resources to each airfield. The Flying Corps on the other hand were in charge of the operation matters related to flying such as unit deployment, air traffic control, ordnance and maintenance.

Since this organization was making the ground support structure available to flying units, the flying units were freed from moving the support staff from one location to another as the unit relocated. Once the unit arrived at its new location, all the airfield staff would come under the control of the commander of that unit.

Chief of OKL and Commander-in-Chief of the Luftwaffe

Chief of the OKL General Staff

References

Citations

Bibliography

 
 
 
 
 
 

Military units and formations of Germany in World War II
Luftwaffe
German High Command during World War II
Germany Nazi